David Nakhid (born 15 May 1964) is a Trinidad and Tobago politician and former professional footballer who serves as a Senator for the United National Congress.

He played as a midfielder and represented Trinidad and Tobago internationally between 1992 and 2005, playing in three CONCACAF Gold Cup editions: 1996, 1998, and 2000. He later entered the Senate of Trinidad and Tobago.

Football career

Club career
After playing college soccer at American University, Nakhid played as a professional in Belgium, Switzerland, Greece, Lebanon, Trinidad and Tobago, the United States, Sweden, and the United Arab Emirates for KSV Waregem, Grasshopper, PAOK, Al-Ansar, Joe Public, New England Revolution, Emirates Club, Al-Mabarrah, and Caledonia AIA.

International career 
Nakhid also played for the Trinidad and Tobago national team between 1992 and 2005, scoring 8 goals in 35 games, including playing in six FIFA World Cup qualifying matches.

On 26 March 1995, while playing in Lebanon for Ansar, Nakhid played a friendly against the Egypt national team as part of a "select" team of Nejmeh and Ansar players. The match ended 1–1, with Nakhid scoring his side's only goal.

Managerial career 
In 2002 Nakhid coached Lebanese side Mabarra, while in 2011 he coached Racing Beirut.

Political career
Nakhid is a senator for the United National Congress.

Personal life
Nakhid runs the David Nakhid International Football School.

On 16 October 2015, he announced that he had the five nominations from football associations to become a FIFA President candidate. Twelve days later, his campaign was over after it was found that U.S. Virgin Islands Soccer Federation had nominated two candidates, both nominations had been declared null by FIFA but the other unnamed candidate had more than the minimum five nominations and was able to continue his campaign. Nakhid announced his decision to appeal.

See also
 List of Lebanon international footballers born outside Lebanon

References

External links
 

1964 births
Living people
Trinidad and Tobago footballers
Association football midfielders
Sportspeople from Port of Spain
Trinidad and Tobago expatriate footballers
Expatriate soccer players in the United States
Trinidad and Tobago expatriate sportspeople in the United States
American Eagles men's soccer players
Major Indoor Soccer League (1978–1992) players
Baltimore Blast (1980–1992) players
Expatriate footballers in Belgium
Trinidad and Tobago expatriate sportspeople in Belgium
Belgian Pro League players
K.S.V. Waregem players
Expatriate footballers in Switzerland
Trinidad and Tobago expatriate sportspeople in Switzerland
Swiss Super League players
Grasshopper Club Zürich players
Expatriate footballers in Greece
Trinidad and Tobago expatriate sportspeople in Greece
PAOK FC players
Expatriate footballers in Lebanon
Trinidad and Tobago expatriate sportspeople in Lebanon
Lebanese Premier League players
Al Ansar FC players
TT Pro League players
Joe Public F.C. players
Major League Soccer players
New England Revolution players
Expatriate footballers in Sweden
Trinidad and Tobago expatriate sportspeople in Sweden
Malmö FF players
Expatriate footballers in the United Arab Emirates
Trinidad and Tobago expatriate sportspeople in the United Arab Emirates
UAE Pro League players
Emirates Club players
Al Mabarra Club players
Morvant Caledonia United players
Trinidad and Tobago international footballers
1996 CONCACAF Gold Cup players
1998 CONCACAF Gold Cup players
2000 CONCACAF Gold Cup players
Trinidad and Tobago football managers
Al Mabarra FC managers
Racing Club Beirut managers
Members of the Senate (Trinidad and Tobago)
United National Congress politicians